The Asian Weightlifting Federation (AWF) is the official governing body for the sport of weightlifting in Asia. It is responsible for organizing competitions such as the Asian Weightlifting Championships and setting down rules and guidelines. Given the size of Asia, the federation has specific organisations operating in its countries such as the Japan Weightlifting Association, etc.

Events
 Main article : Asian Weightlifting Championships (open age)
 Main article : Asian Junior Weightlifting Championships (15 - 20 age)
 Main article : Asian Youth Weightlifting Championships (13 - 17 age)
 Main article : Asian Masters Weightlifting Championships (+35 age)
 Main article : Asian Club Weightlifting Championships (clubs : junior and senior)

Members & Executive Board 
Under the Olympic Council of Asia, it has 45 member weightlifting associations under their respective National Olympic Committees, split by regional zones; 

Executive Board:

President :
 Mohamed Yousef Al Mana (Qatar)

General Secretary:
Mohamed Ahmed Al Harbi (KSA)

1st Vice President:
Mohamed Hassan Jaloud (Iraq)

Vice Presidents:

Shakrillo Mahmudov (Uzbekistan)
Sung Young Choi (South Korea)
Meng Bo (China)
Abdulla Al Jarmal (Yemen)
Monico Puentavella (Philippines)

Executive Board Members:

Ahmed Mohyuddin (Bangladesh)
Ebrahem Alemyan (Jordan)
Sajjad Anoushiravini (Iran)
Sen Gupta (Nepal)
Eshaq Ebrahim Eshaq (Bahrain)
Junichi Okada (Japan)
Meco Chang (Taiwan)
Hassanin Alchikh (Syria)
Omurzhan Moldodosov (Kyrgyzstan)
Khodr Moukalled (Lebanon)
Hafiz Imran Butt (Pakistan)

Notes

External links
 

Asia
Weightlifting
Weightlifting in Asia